Mission Trails Regional Park is a  open space preserve within the city of San Diego, California, established in 1974. It is the sixth-largest municipally owned park in the United States, and the largest in California.

Description

The park consists mostly of rugged canyons and hills, with both natural and developed recreation areas, including beautiful flowers. The highest point is  Cowles Mountain, which is also the highest point in the city of San Diego. The San Diego River flows through the park. A one-way access road goes through the park, allowing hikers, bikers and pedestrians on one side and cars on the other. The park is open every day of the year. 

The park has 60 miles of hiking, mountain bike and equestrian trails, a rock climbing area, and the Kumeyaay Lake Campground with 46 camp sites adjacent to a small lake.  There is also the  Mission Trails Regional Park Visitor and Interpretive Center. It includes a number of exhibits, a library, and a 93-seat theater that includes a Blu-ray projection system with a large screen.  The Visitor Center also includes an art gallery. The most popular trail of the park is the Cowles Mountain trail (pronounced Colz), which takes hundreds of people per day to the summit for a 360-degree panorama of San Diego County. Another popular stop is the Old Mission Dam, which was built to supply irrigation water to farm land that supplied food for the Mission San Diego de Alcala, the first of the chain of missions established by Junípero Serra in California. Another popular destination within the park is Lake Murray, a reservoir supplying water to San Diego neighborhoods. It has a surface area of approximately 168 acres. The lake is periodically stocked with trout and bass.   

On December 17, 2014, West Sycamore was officially opened to the public.  This increased the size of the park by just over 1,100 acres and includes 6 miles of trails.
West Sycamore is located adjacent to the Scripps Ranch community and is at the very east end of Stonebridge Parkway. It is north of the main area of MTRP. 

Special annual events at Mission Trails include the Amateur Photo Contest which begins in March and entries are due by the middle of April. Each year the park celebrates Explore Mission Trails Day (EMTD) on the third Saturday of May.  All the activities for EMTD are free and take place at the Visitor and Interpretive Center and at the Equestrian Staging Area.

Natural history
The park is in the California chaparral and woodlands ecoregion. It has coastal sage and chaparral and riparian habitats and plant communities of California native plants.

2003 Cedar Fire
A significant portion of the park was burned by the Cedar Fire in 2003. As is typical of a chaparral ecology, within a few years the park had recovered and exhibited little evidence of recent fire damage.

References

Sources
 San Diego's Mission Trails Regional Park : Official Guidebook, by Pamela Crooks, 2003,

External links

 City of San Diego: Mission Trails Regional Park website.

Parks in San Diego
Nature reserves in California
Regional parks in California
San Diego River